Mark Hetzler (born 1968 in Sarasota, Florida) is an American trombonist and former member of the Empire Brass Quintet.  Hetzler has performed with the Minnesota Orchestra, Boston Pops, Hartford Symphony Orchestra, Springfield Symphony Orchestra, Florida Orchestra, and the Boston Symphony Orchestra.  As a member of the Empire Brass Quintet from 1996–2012, he performed in recital and as a soloist with symphony orchestras in Australia, Taiwan, Korea, China, Venezuela, Brazil, Japan, Hong Kong, Germany, Italy, Austria, Malaysia, Singapore, Switzerland, Bermuda, St. Bartholomew and across the United States. He appeared with the Empire Brass Quintet on live television and radio broadcasts in Asia and the United States.  He is on several of the critically acclaimed Empire Brass CDs on the Telarc label, including Firedance, The Glory of Gabrieli, and a recording of Baroque music for Brass and Organ.  Hetzler has recorded ten solo albums released on Summit Records; he has also recorded for the Arista Records label.

Hetzler received a bachelor's degree in music from Boston University and a master's degree from the New England Conservatory of Music.  From 2000 – 2004, Hetzler was a faculty member at Florida International University where he ran the trombone studio.  In addition, he was also a professor at Lynn University in Boca Raton, Florida. At Lynn, he ran the trombone studio and taught music appreciation. Currently, Hetzler is a professor in the School of Music at the University of Wisconsin–Madison, where he continues to teach trombone and performs with the resident quintet.

Discography
American Voices
Serious Songs, Sad Faces
20th Century Architects
American Voices II
Sonatas, Dynamic Elements
Three Views
Blues, Ballads and Beyond

References

External links
Hetzler's biography at UW–Madison

1968 births
Living people
American trombonists
Male trombonists
Boston University College of Fine Arts alumni
New England Conservatory alumni
Florida International University faculty
People from Sarasota, Florida
University of Wisconsin–Madison faculty
21st-century trombonists
21st-century American male musicians
Summit Records artists